Yumin is a town under the administration of Yuechi County, Sichuan, China. , it has one residential community and 26 villages under its administration.

References

Township-level divisions of Sichuan
Yuechi County